Jessica Julia Roland-Pratt (born June 1, 1982) is a former professional tennis player from Puerto Rico.

Biography
Born in Hollywood, California, Roland is a graduate of Hollywood High School, where she was a two-time Los Angeles City singles champion. She is of Puerto Rican descent on her mother's side, which she chose to represent in international competition, making her first Fed Cup appearance in 2000.

From 2000 to 2004 she attended Texas A&M on a tennis scholarship, earning All-American honors in her senior year.

Roland, a right-handed player, continued to play Fed Cup tennis for Puerto Rico until 2010 and finished with 26 ties to her name, for a 16/18 overall win–loss record. At the 2010 Central American and Caribbean Games she partnered Monica Puig in the women's doubles and at the 2011 Pan American Games she was a quarter-finalist in the women's singles competition.

During her professional career, she won three $10,000 ITF doubles titles and played her last tournament in 2012.

She was previously known as Jessica Roland-Rosario.

Jessica Roland Pratt is now the Owner and Executive Director of The Tennis Place - Fit Fun Tennis Community Programs with a mission to bring organized tennis programming to public parks for all to enjoy.

ITF finals

Singles (0–3)

Doubles (3–0)

References

External links
 
 
 

1982 births
Living people
Puerto Rican female tennis players
Tennis players from Los Angeles
Hollywood High School alumni
Texas A&M Aggies women's tennis players
American people of Puerto Rican descent
Competitors at the 2010 Central American and Caribbean Games
Tennis players at the 2011 Pan American Games
Pan American Games competitors for Puerto Rico